Trabuco Canyon (Trabuco, Spanish for "Blunderbuss") is a small unincorporated community located in the foothills of the Santa Ana Mountains in eastern Orange County, California, and lies partly within the Cleveland National Forest.

Trabuco Canyon is north of the town of Rancho Santa Margarita. Plano Trabuco Road leads from the top of the canyon south to Rancho Santa Margarita.

History
Trabuco is Spanish for blunderbuss, a type of shotgun. Some credit a Franciscan friar traveling with the Gaspar de Portolá Expedition in 1769 with the story that a blunderbuss was lost in the canyon, after which the area was named. A mission was originally to be built in the canyon, but was instead established in San Juan Capistrano.

The Trabuco Adobe was built in 1810 next to the Acjachemen village of Alume that was also identified during the 1769 Portolá expedition, where Juan Crespí wrote, "we made camp close to a village of the most tractable and friendly heathens we have seen upon the whole way."

John (Don Juan) Forster received a Mexican land grant in 1846 and established Rancho Trabuco. The grant was bordered by Rancho Cañada de los Alisos on the west, and by Rancho Mission Viejo on the east.

Trabuco Canyon was the site of attempts to mine tin in the early 1900s. Mining remains from this activity include: tunnels into the sides of the canyon (closed for public safety); the stone foundation of an ore-processing stamp mill; and several dams on the creek.

The Trabuco Canyon National Forest was established in 1907, which was quickly combined into the Cleveland National Forest in 1908.

One of the last California grizzly bears was killed in Trabuco Canyon in 1908, a female bear thought to be the mate of the so-called "Monster of San Mateo." 

On October 21, 2007, a large wildfire started in Silverado Canyon and spread to Trabuco Canyon. The Canyon was evacuated by the Fire Department.

Features
Fourth of July features an old-fashioned parade of locals riding horses and pulling home-made floats. A local landmark is the Trabuco Oaks Steakhouse, which was a favorite restaurant of former President Richard Nixon.

The Trabuco Canyon Community Church is located in the canyon also.

See also
Trabuco Creek

References

External links
 Fire Blog

Unincorporated communities in Orange County, California
Santa Ana Mountains
 
Unincorporated communities in California